GreatAmerica Financial Services is a national commercial equipment finance company that provides financing and consulting services in the United States, and some of the U.S. Territories.

History
The company was founded in 1990. In 1992, the company relocated from Michigan to Cedar Rapids, Iowa and became GreatAmerica Leasing Corporation. At that time, there were only four employees, which included founder Anton (Tony) Golobic, his wife Magda, and two others. In November 2012, the company adopted the new trade name GreatAmerica Financial Services Corporation.

GreatAmerica is the largest independent, family-owned national commercial equipment finance company in the U.S. and is dedicated to helping manufacturers, vendors, and dealers be more successful and keep their customers for a lifetime. A $2.4 Billion company with life-to-date finance originations of $13.5 Billion in the office equipment, communications, light industrial, information technology, automotive service and repair, and franchise industries. In addition to financing, GreatAmerica offers non-financial services under GreatAmerica Portfolio Services and Collabrance LLC, a master managed services provider. 

In 2004, an investment group including GreatAmerica Leasing Corporation and CEO Tony Golobic purchased the GreatAmerica Building for $16 million. During the Flood of 2008, the company activated their disaster recovery plan and relocated staff and resources to pre-arranged recovery sites. Staff did not return to the GreatAmerica building in downtown Cedar Rapids for 68 days.

In late 2009, GreatAmerica Leasing Corporation surpassed $1 billion in assets.

In 2009 GreatAmerica launched the Master Managed Services Provider subsidiary company, Collabrance LLC, as a value-add service to their Strategic Solutions Group.

In June 2011, the company purchased the GreatAmerica building from River Cedar Properties LLC for $22.5 Million 

In November, 2017, GreatAmerica announced that it surpassed the $2 billion mark in assets and concurrently reached its 25th year of uninterrupted organic growth.

In 2022, GreatAmerica expanded its presence in the franchise financing business by acquiring Illinois-based IRH Capital LLC, a 20-year veteran in the franchise financing industry.

References

American companies established in 1990
Privately held companies based in Iowa